Shane Michael Carden (born November 6, 1991) is a former American football quarterback, and current Wood River High School head football coach. He was the MVP of Conference USA as a Junior while playing quarterback for East Carolina in 2013 and the American Athletic Conference Offensive Player of the Year during his Senior year in 2014. After his college career at ECU he was signed by the Chicago Bears as an undrafted free agent in 2015. 

He also played with the Stuttgart Scorpions of the German Football League, the Montreal Alouettes of the Canadian Football League (CFL) and the Baltimore Brigade of the Arena Football League (AFL).

Early years
Carden was born in Newport Beach, California and moved to Houston, Texas. He attended Episcopal High School in Bellaire, Texas.

College career
Carden was redshirted as a freshman in 2010 after not beating out Dominique Davis. In 2011, he appeared in one game as a wide receiver. After entering his sophomore season in 2012 as a backup, Carden started the team's third game and remained the starter the rest of the season. He finished the season completing 273 of 413 passes for 3,116 yards, 23 touchdowns and 10 interceptions. In 2013, he started all 13 games, completing 387 of 549 passes for a school record 4,139 yards, 33 touchdowns and 10 interceptions. He also rushed for ten touchdowns. For his play he was named the Conference USA Most Valuable Player. During his senior season in 2014, Carden set the school record for career passing yards and passing touchdowns, passing David Garrard and Dominique Davis' records. He finished the season completing 392 of 617 passes for 4,736 yards (breaking the previous year's record), 30 touchdowns and 10 interceptions. For his play, he was named the American Athletic Conference Offensive Player of the Year.

Carden ended his career with 11,991 passing yards, 86 touchdowns and 30 interceptions.

College statistics

Professional career
Carden was rated the tenth best quarterback in the 2015 NFL Draft by NFLDraftScout.com. Lance Zierlein of NFL.com predicted that he would be selected in the seventh round. Zierlein said that Carden "Lacks the desired play traits that NFL teams look for, but his production and poise on the move are undeniable and he is a very quick processor on the field."

Chicago Bears
After going undrafted in the 2015 NFL Draft, he signed with the Chicago Bears. On September 1, 2015, he was released by the Bears.

Stuttgart Scorpions
In 2016 after being released from the Bears, he signed with the Stuttgart Scorpions of the German Football League. 
Carden passed for 3258 yards in 14 games and 36 touchdowns with 13 interceptions. He had a 145.8 passer rating as the Scorpions finished with a 7-7 record.

Montreal Alouettes 
Carden was signed by the Montreal Alouettes (CFL) on September 14, 2016, partway through the 2016 CFL season. During the season, he carried the ball twice for two yards. He was released by the Alouettes on February 7, 2017.

Baltimore Brigade
Carden signed with the Baltimore Brigade in February 2017. He relieved starter Chase Cartwright in the second quarter of the first game of the season. Carden then started the next 12 games for the Brigade. He suffered a concussion on July 29 against the Philadelphia Soul, and was placed on injured reserve on August 2. Carden played in 13 out of 14 regular season games, starting 12, in 2017, completing 275 of 431 passes for 3,189 yards, 63 touchdowns and 16 interceptions. He also rushed for 110 yards and 8 touchdowns. He became the first rookie quarterback since 2011 to throw for over 3,000 yards. On August 23, 2017, Carden was named the AFL Rookie of the Year.

Coaching career

High school 
Prior to the 2019 season, Carden was named the Head Coach at Wood River High School in Hailey, Idaho. He served as the Wood River Offensive Coordinator in 2018.

Personal
Carden's father, Jay Carden, played minor league baseball from 1963 to 1970.

References

External links
East Carolina Pirates bio

1993 births
Living people
Sportspeople from Newport Beach, California
Players of American football from California
Players of American football from Houston
Players of Canadian football from Houston
American football quarterbacks
Canadian football quarterbacks
American players of Canadian football
East Carolina Pirates football players
Chicago Bears players
Montreal Alouettes players
German Football League players
Baltimore Brigade players
American expatriate sportspeople in Germany
American expatriate players of American football